Montmartre Rose is a 1929 American silent drama film directed by Bernard McEveety and starring Marguerite De La Motte, Rosemary Theby and Harry Myers.

Plot 
A respectable Paris jeweller becomes engaged to a celebrated performer of the Montmartre cafes.

Cast
 Marguerite De La Motte as Jeanne 
 Rosemary Theby
 Harry Myers
 Paul Ralli
 Frank Leigh
 Martha Mattox

References

Bibliography
 Munden, Kenneth White. The American Film Institute Catalog of Motion Pictures Produced in the United States, Part 1. University of California Press, 1997.

External links

1929 films
1929 drama films
Silent American drama films
Films directed by Bernard McEveety
American silent feature films
1920s English-language films
American black-and-white films
Films set in Paris
1920s American films